Nizhnenikolsky is a rural locality (a settlement) in Obrastsovo-Travinsky Selsoviet, Kamyzyaksky District, Astrakhan Oblast, Russia. The population was 282 as of 2010. There are 3 streets.

Geography 
Nizhnenikolsky is located 32 km south of Kamyzyak (the district's administrative centre) by road. Obrastsovo-Travino is the nearest rural locality.

References 

Rural localities in Kamyzyaksky District